Rhinella tenrec is a species of toad in the family Bufonidae.
It is endemic to Colombia.
Its natural habitat is subtropical or tropical moist lowland forests.
It is threatened by habitat loss.

References

tenrec
Amphibians of Colombia
Amphibians described in 1990
Taxonomy articles created by Polbot